Michelle Brasier is a Melbourne-based comedian, singer, writer and actor. She is known for her work with Aunty Donna and performing in comedy duo Double Denim with Laura Frew.

Education 
Brasier grew up in Wagga Wagga and studied musical theatre at Victorian College of the Arts.

Career 
The comedy duo Double Denim, which Brazier performed in with Laura Frew, won best newcomers at the Sydney Comedy Festival and director's choice at the Melbourne International Comedy Festival.

Brasier's solo comedy shows, which usually involve a musical aspect, include Space Tortoise (2016), Average Bear (2021), and Reform (2022).

Average Bear, a personal show on the impact of cancer on her family, won Sydney Comedy Festival's Director's Choice award. It was performed at the Edinburgh Fringe Festival in 2022, and will soon air as a special on Paramount Plus.

She has worked on Shaun Micallef's Mad as Hell, and often collaborated with the absurdist trio Aunty Donna, particularly for Aunty Donna's Big Ol' House of Fun.

Personal life 
Her partner Tim Lancaster is a musician who has performed in some of Brasier's shows.

References 

People from Wagga Wagga
Australian comedians
Year of birth missing (living people)
Living people